Hacıköy may refer to:

 Hacıköy, Bayramiç
 Hacıköy, Biga
 Hacıköy, Gölpazarı
 Hacıköy, Kalecik
 Hacıköy, Kastamonu
 Hacıköy, Kurucaşile
 Hacıköy, Refahiye